Polanco is a Spanish surname originating from the municipality of Polanco, Cantabria in Spain.  Notable people with the surname include:

 Alfonso Polanco, mayor of Palencia, Spain 
 Amelia Vega Polanco, Miss Universe 2003
 Andrés López Polanco, painter active in 17th century in Valencia, Spain  
 Antonio Botín Polanco, Spanish writer from Santander, Cantabria
 Dascha Polanco (born 1982), Dominican-American actress
 Eduardo Saenz de Buruaga y Polanco, Spanish military general
 Francisco Polanco, Spanish baroque painter of 17th century
 Jesús Polanco (1929–2007), Spanish businessman and founder of El Pais and Grupo PRISA. Ranked in Forbes' richest list 2006
 Jorge Polanco (born 1993), Dominican baseball player
 Jose Maria Alfaro Polanco, Spanish writer and politician
 Juan Hidalgo de Polanco (1614-1685), Spanish composer, father of the Spanish Opera and of the Zarzuela  
 Juan Alfonso de Polanco (1517-1576)- Spanish Jesuit Priest and secretary to Ignatius of Loyola  
 Luis Polanco, Spanish governor of Toleto 
 Nicolás Manrique de Lara y Polanco, noble of the Marquesado de Lara 
 Plácido Polanco (born 1975), Dominican-American Major League Baseball infielder
 Polanco family, noble family from Santillana del Mar, Cantabria
 Tomas Polanco Alcantara, Venezuelan writer and historian
Victoriano Polanco, Spanish painter from Santander

See also
 Polanco

References

Spanish-language surnames